The ukelin is a bowed psaltery with zither strings made popular in the 1920s.  It is meant to be a combination of the violin and the Hawaiian ukulele.  It lost popularity prior to the 1970s because the instrument was difficult to play and often returned to the manufacturer before it had been completely paid for.

History
The history of the ukelin is hard to trace, since there were several instruments resembling the ukelin that were produced in the 1920s.  Paul F. Richter filed the first known ukelin patent in December 1924, it was granted in April 1926. The Phonoharp Company, which merged with Oscar Schmidt, Inc. the same year, began producing ukelins in 1926. However, an instrument greatly resembling the ukelin had had its patent filed in 1923, a year before Richter filed his; yet the patent, filed by John Large, was not granted until after Richter's patent had already been given. Another similar instrument had a patent filed by Walter Schmidt in 1925.  Because of these patents filed one after the other it is unclear who really invented the first ukelin.

Violinist Henry Charles Marx was one of the first to sell what he called a violin-uke, among many other instruments he created to be manufactured by his company Marxochime Colony.  He is thought to be the first to manufacture the instrument but soon had his design copied by International Music Company, who sold it under the name ukelin.  The Phonoharp Company sold Richter's design before merging with Oscar Schmidt in 1926.  Marxochime and Oscar Schmidt International, Inc. sold their instruments door-to-door through traveling salesmen, often to poor rural families.  The salesmen would purchase the instruments from the company, then sell them at an inflated price, often on a payment plan.  These prices increased as the economy grew stronger after the Depression.  The customers were sometimes told that they were buying the instrument at a reduced price compared to a music store, but there is no evidence that they were ever sold in music stores.  The instruments were usually sold for $35-$40.

Playing
The ukelin has sixteen melody strings and sixteen bass strings, divided into groups of four for playing accompanying chords.  There is one large bass string in each group and three smaller chord strings.  The ukelin is placed on the table in front of the player.  The melody strings are played with a bow in the right hand, and the bass strings are plucked or strummed with the fingernails of the left hand or a pick.  The ukelin is tuned to a C major scale, and unless tuned to include them, is unable to play chromatic notes; therefore, it is limited in what it can play.  For ease of playing for amateurs, the strings are given numbers, and the booklets that were sold with the ukelin would give these numbers, a tabulature notation, instead of notes on a staff, for playing simple songs.

Decline
Ukelins were sold to people under the impression that the instrument was easy to play, but this was not the case.  They were also quite limited as to what they were capable of playing because they were designed as diatonic instruments.  As a result, many instruments were returned to the manufacturers, who ended up with piles of instruments that they couldn't sell.  Salesmen misrepresented the instruments to customers, who felt as if they had been tricked into buying a worthless instrument.  Oscar Schmidt, Inc. stopped producing the ukelin in 1964 after the new owner, Glen Peterson, discovered the shady business practices of some of his salesmen.  Between instrument returns and a declining interest in musical instruments due to the advent of television as a form of family entertainment, Marxochime was no longer able to produce the violin-uke and halted production in 1972.

See also 
Marxophone

References

External links
 Bob's Ukelin Home
 Amazing Grace played on the ukelin

Box zithers
Bowed string instruments